Eric Palmer Kumerow (born April 17, 1965) is a former American football linebacker who played three seasons for the Miami Dolphins and one season with the Chicago Bears in the National Football League (NFL). He played 42 games in his NFL career.

Kumerow was born in 1965 in Chicago, Illinois and went to Oak Park River Forest high school. He played quarterback and defensive back there before going to Ohio State and playing linebacker. He would later be drafted in the first round of the 1988 NFL Draft by the Miami Dolphins. He did not perform as well as expected to and was considered to be a draft "bust". He played three seasons with the Dolphins before going to the Chicago Bears. He tore his Achilles tendon before his fourth season started and subsequently retired.

Early life 
Eric Kumerow was born on April 17, 1965 in Chicago Illinois. He went to high school at Oak Park (IL) River Forest. While in high school he played quarterback and defensive back, and was named USA Today High School All-American in 1982. He won numerous other awards in football and basketball, including being named The Tribune Athlete of the Month Award in December 1982, being named The Tribune All-State in 1982, and being named to the Associated Press and United Press International All-State teams. In addition to football, he was a standout basketball player. His basketball coach Bob Parker said "Eric's the best athlete I've ever coached."

College career
Kumerow went to college at Ohio State. He started his career as a quarterback, which he played in high school, but switched to defense after spending his first season "on the bench." When he went to Ohio State, he focused more on football and did not play basketball. In college he played linebacker, and was named Big Ten Defensive Lineman of the year in 1986. He played alongside future pro bowl linebacker Chris Spielman while at Ohio State. In 1986, when he won Defensive Lineman of the Year honors, he had 66 tackles (9 for a loss of 62 yards), had an interception, an 6 passes defended. His best game of the season came against Iowa, where he had 8 tackles, a sack, and a pass defended to earn Associated Press Lineman of the Week honors. He was named team captain in 1987 and was named First-team All Big Ten. He finished his college career with 23 sacks, which ranks 6th among all Ohio State players. He was 6-7 and 250 pounds during his college career. He was also an Honorable Mention All-American in his senior year.

Professional career

NFL Draft
In the 1988 NFL Draft, Kumerow was selected by the Miami Dolphins with the 16th overall pick. It was one year after they drafted his brother-in-law John Bosa with the same pick. His drafting received negative response from Dolphins fans because he was predicted to be drafted much later in the draft. According to some sources, the pick even surprised Kumerow.

Miami Dolphins
Kumerow was switched from linebacker to defensive end in his second week of training camp. His first game was played against the Chicago Bears, a team he would later play for. In his first season he played 14 games, had 13 tackles and 3 sacks. He played 12 games in 1989 and all 16 in 1990. He had 2 sacks in '89 but none in '90. He had his only career interception in 1990, which was returned for 5 yards. He didn't start in any games in his Dolphins career.

Chicago Bears
In 1991, he was signed by the Chicago Bears, who originally wanted to draft him. He later tore his Achilles tendon and retired afterwards. He finished his career with 42 games played and 5 sacks.

Personal life
He is the grandson of Chicago Outfit mob boss Tony Accardo, the son of Palmer Pyle, former NFL player, the father of Buffalo Bills wide receiver Jake Kumerow, the brother-in-law of former Miami Dolphins first-round pick John Bosa, and the uncle of Los Angeles Chargers defensive end Joey Bosa and San Francisco 49ers defensive end Nick Bosa. He now resides in the Chicago suburb of Bartlett, Illinois.

References

1965 births
Living people
Players of American football from Chicago
American football linebackers
Ohio State Buckeyes football players
Miami Dolphins players
People from Bartlett, Illinois